Dossier 51 is a 1978 French crime drama film directed by Michel Deville and based on a novel by Gilles Perrault. Deville and Perrault won a César Award for Best Writing for their adaptation. The film was screened in the Un Certain Regard section at the 1978 Cannes Film Festival.

Plot
An elaborate surveillance operation is mounted by a French intelligence agency on a French diplomat, codenamed 51. While his professional life is not suspect, clandestine investigations into his private life reveal an increasing number of vulnerabilities. 

Only surviving child of his adoring mother, she reveals that he was hated by her husband, who had betrayed his biological father to the Gestapo. At his Catholic school, the priests recall his propensity for fantasy about other boys. Military service kept him in an all-male environment and former comrades remember his construction of alternative realities about them. After a student affair with an anarchist of boyish appearance, he hastily married a girl of good family, who gave him two children but sleeps with other men. 

When an agent wins his confidence and starts revealing knowledge of his past, he kills himself by driving into a tree. The operation is wound up.

Cast
 Françoise Béliard - Sylvie Mouriat
 Patrick Chesnais - Hadès
 Jenny Clève - Agent 747
 Jean Dautremay - Esculape 3
 Gérard Dessalles - Brauchite
 Jean-Michel Dupuis - Agent Hécate 8446
 Sabine Glaser - Paméla
 Nathalie Juvet - Marguerite Marie
 Françoise Lugagne - Madame Auphal
 Christophe Malavoy - Agent 8956
 Claude Marcault - Liliane Auphal / 52
 François Marthouret - Dominique Auphal / 51
 Jean Martin - Vénus
 Claire Nadeau - The 9000 Friend
 Michel Aumont - Mars's voice

References

External links

1978 films
1970s French-language films
1978 crime drama films
Films directed by Michel Deville
Gaumont Film Company films
French crime drama films
1970s French films